The 2001 Grand Prix motorcycle racing season was the 53rd F.I.M. Road Racing World Championship season.

Season summary
2001 was the end of the 500 cc era in Grand Prix motorcycle racing; in 2002 the premier class would be renamed MotoGP and dominated by 4-stroke 990 cc machines. However, 2001 was the beginning of another era, that of Valentino Rossi's run of championships in the top class. His learning year past him, he won 11 races in 2001, far outdistancing his nearest competitor, Max Biaggi. Rossi and Biaggi began the season with a controversial incident at Suzuka, where Biaggi seemed to have tried to push Rossi into the dirt at 150 mph and Rossi responded two laps later with an aggressive pass and an extended middle finger. Rossi would win that race and sew-up the championship with two rounds to go. As of 2020, it was the last season where a satellite rider won the rider championship title in the premier class.

The 500 cc Rookie of the Year award went to Shinya Nakano. At the 2001 Japanese motorcycle Grand Prix, Katja Poensgen became the first female competitor to qualify for a 250cc Grand Prix race.

As of 2023, it was the last year where a single constructor (Honda) won the championship in all three categories.

2001 Grand Prix season calendar
In the weekend of 20 to 22 October 2000, the FIM confirmed the 2001 calendar. The following sixteen Grands Prix were scheduled to take place:

 †† = Saturday race

Calendar changes
 The South African Grand Prix was moved back, from 19 March to 22 April.
 The Rio de Janeiro Grand Prix was moved back, from 7 October to 3 November.
 The Malaysian Grand Prix was moved back, from 2 April to 21 October.

2001 Grand Prix seasons results

†† = Saturday race

Participants

500cc participants

 All entries used Michelin tyres.

250cc participants

125cc participants

Standings

500cc riders' standings

Scoring system
Points were awarded to the top fifteen finishers. A rider had to finish the race to earn points.

250cc riders' standings

Scoring system
Points were awarded to the top fifteen finishers. A rider had to finish the race to earn points.

125cc riders' standings

Scoring system
Points were awarded to the top fifteen finishers. A rider had to finish the race to earn points.

500cc manufacturers' standings

250cc manufacturers' standings

125cc manufacturers' standings

References

Grand Prix motorcycle racing seasons
MotoGP racing season